Hoo-Bangin' Records  is a record label founded by Dedrick "Mack 10" Rolison. He took the name from the name of the song "Hoo Bangin'" by his group, Westside Connection. Hoo-Bangin' Records was recently released from its contract at Priority Records and Capitol Records and now signed a deal with Fontana Distribution.

History

2011 - Present
In 2011, it was announced that Mack 10 has revived Hoo Bangin'. Mack has signed a new distribution with Fontana, and revealed that he has a new lineup of respected veteran MCs, most notably Xzibit. The platinum artist Xzibit will be joined by his former Strong Arm Steady band-mate Mitchy Slick, Oakland's Richie Rich, Glasses Malone and former Snoop Dogg group, The LBC Crew - with includes original Hoo Bangin' MC Techniec.

The first release for Hoo Bangin' would be Mack 10 and Glasses Malone's collaborative release, Mack/Malone, on April 12. The long-delayed release will be Glasses' first retail album, while his Universal/Cash Money solo debut, Beach Cruiser released August 30.

In a statement, Mack 10 said the following: "The Mack/Malone project is the perfect way to let folks know that Hoo Bangin' is coming back strong. We have been working really hard to make this release a memorable project for our fans. I want Hoo Bangin' to become the home of the best on the west."

In August, Mack 10 re-signed Los Angeles quintet the Young Hoggs. The group worked extensively on Mack's 2003 project, Ghetto, Gutter & Gangsta. Reports that the Hoggs' debut album, The Hottest Around, will features appearances by Julio G, Dre'sta tha Gangsta and Big Wy of The Relativez.

Discography
1998
 Mack 10 - The Recipe
 Allfrumtha I - AllFrumTha I

1999
 CJ Mac - Platinum Game
 C.O.G. - Chilldrin of da Ghetto
 MC Eiht - Section 8
 Various Artists - Hoo-Bangin':The Mixtape, Vol. 1
 Various Artists - Thicker than Water (soundtrack)

2000
 The Comrads - Wake Up & Ball
 Mack 10 - The Paper Route
 MC Eiht - N' My Neighborhood

2002
 Da Hood - Da Hood

2003
 Mack 10 - Ghetto, Gutter & Gangsta
 Westside Connection - Terrorist Threats

2005
 Mack 10 - Hustla's Handbook

2009
 Mack 10 - Soft White

2011
 Mack & Malone - Money Music
 Glasses Malone - Beach Cruiser

Roster

Current artists
 Mack 10
 Glasses Malone
 Ya Boy
 Richie Rich
 The LBC Crew (Bad Azz, Techniec, Lil' C-Style)
 Mitchy Slick

Former artists
 Allfrumtha I (Binky Mack & Squeak Ru)
 Bad Azz
 CJ Mac
 The Comrads (Gangsta & K-Mac)
 Da Hood (Cousteau, Deviossi, K-Mac, Mack 10, Skoop Delania & Techniec)
 MC Eiht
 Red Café
 Road Dawgs (G-Luv & Swamp Rat)
 Techniec
 Westside Connection (Mack 10, WC & Ice Cube)
 Xzibit
 Soultre' (Nanci Fletcher, Mia Bell, Indira Tyler)

Film Production
 Thicker than Water (1999)
 WWF Aggression
 Entrance themes.

References

External links
 Official Website

Record labels established in 1996
American record labels
Hip hop record labels
Vanity record labels
Labels distributed by Universal Music Group
Gangsta rap record labels